Florence Blain Mbaye, sometimes credited as Florence Blain, is a Canadian actress, singer and dancer. She is most noted for her role in the 2013 film Another House (L'autre maison), for which she garnered a Canadian Screen Award nomination for Best Supporting Actress at the 2nd Canadian Screen Awards.

Her other film roles have included Waiting for April (En attendant avril), There Are No False Undertakings (Il n'y a pas de faux métier) and This House (Cette maison). She has also had roles in television and theatre, and is an oboist and singer who has performed with the UBS Verbier Festival Orchestra, the Orquesta y Coro Nacionales de España, Les Violons du Roy, the Metropolitan Orchestra of Montreal, Philippe B and Avec pas d'casque, among others.

She was one of the narrators of the 2021 animated documentary film Archipelago (Archipel).

References

External links

Canadian film actresses
Canadian television actresses
Canadian stage actresses
Canadian oboists
Black Canadian actresses
Black Canadian musicians
Actresses from Quebec
Musicians from Quebec
Living people
Year of birth missing (living people)
Canadian people of Ghanaian descent